The pygarg is an animal mentioned in the Bible in  as one of the animals permitted for food.

Its colour is pure white, with the exception of a short black mane, and a tinge of tawny on the shoulders and back".

References

Animals in the Bible
Kosher meat